Dark Moor is the fourth full-length album of the Spanish power metal band Dark Moor.

Shortly before releasing The Gates of Oblivion, the band announced their split. Due to musical differences, Elisa C. Martín, Albert Maroto and Jorge Saez left the band, and formed Dreamaker. Enrik Garcia and Anan Kaddouri remained with Dark Moor. Alfred Romero joined the band as the new lead singer. Jose Garrido (guitars) joined shortly after, followed by Andy C. on the drums. They traveled to Italy to record Dark Moor.

Track listing
"A Life for Revenge" - 5:48
"Eternity" - 4:23
"The Bane of Daninsky (The Werewolf)" - 5:30
"Philip, The Second" - 6:45
"From Hell" - 3:51
"Cyrano of Bergerac" - 7:41
"Overture (Attila)" - 2:48
"Wind Like Stroke (Attila)" - 5:16
"Return for Love (Attila)" - 4:19
"Amore Venio (Attila)" - 0:55
"The Ghost Sword (Attila)" - 4:53
"The Dark Moor" - 8:36
"The Mysterious Maiden" (Japanese bonus track) - 4:55

Band 
 Alfred Romero - lead vocals & choirs
 Enrik García - guitars, choirs
 Jose Garrido - guitars, choirs
 Anan Kaddouri - bass
 Andy C. - drums

Additional musicians 
 Beatriz Albert - soprano on #06, 10 & 12, choirs
 Isabel Garcia - pianos & keyboards 
 Mamen Castaño - choirs
 Choir of Scciola Media 'Montegrappa' - choirs

Concepts
 "A Life for Revenge" is based on the adventure novel by Alexandre Dumas, The Count of Monte Cristo. 
 "The Bane of Daninsky (The Werewolf)" is a homage to Spanish actor Jacinto Molina ("Paul Naschy"), as Waldemar Daninsky (a wolfman he played in 12 movies) was one of his most famous roles.
 "Philip, the Second" is about the life of Philip, the King of Spain from 1556 until 1598. 
 "Cyrano of Bergerac" is about Cyrano de Bergerac, a French dramatist and duelist who is now best remembered for the many works of fiction which have been woven around his life story.
 "Overture", "Wind Like Stroke", "Return for Love", "Amore Venio" and "The Ghost Sword" are based upon the life of Attila, the Hun.
 "The Dark Moor" (as well the name of the band) is based upon the Riftwar Saga, a series of fantasy novels by Raymond E. Feist.

References

External links
 Dark Moor Official Website

2003 albums
Dark Moor albums